William Matt Brown (1815–1885) was an American Whig politician. He served as the Mayor of Nashville, Tennessee from 1865 to 1867.

Biography

Early life
He was born on September 15, 1815 in Franklin County, Kentucky.

Career
He served as Mayor of Nashville from 1865 to 1867. He believed the 1867 election was fraudulent, and was forced from the courthouse by armed federal soldiers, declaring "I want it understood, gentlemen, that I yield to the bayonet and that alone."

Personal life
He married Mary Jane Morton in 1844. They had eight children, four of whom died infancy. Their four surviving children were William Matt, Jr., Mrs. Carrie Rather, Mary Ellis Brown and Jeannie Brown. He died on September 12, 1885 at his house on South Summer Street in Nashville.

References

1815 births
1885 deaths
People from Franklin County, Kentucky
Mayors of Nashville, Tennessee
Tennessee Whigs
19th-century American politicians